A short refinance is a transaction in which a lender agrees to refinance a borrower's home for the current market value, in effect making it more cost effective for the borrower. The lender agrees to replace his own current loan with a new one, and pays off the difference. This new loan typically has a lower balance, and borrowers typically receive a new interest rate, which is often lower than their former one- resulting in a reduced mortgage payment.

Declining markets
A short refinance takes place when the borrower's loan balance is more than the property's worth. This is often attributable to declining markets, such as in the recession of 2008, which stressed the financial system's ability to supply mortgage credit, subsequently limiting the ability of Americans to refinance mortgages and buy homes.

Benefits of a short refinance
The borrower avoids foreclosure and keeps their home. The bank takes a smaller loss than they would with a foreclosure.

Difficulties
The hardest part of getting a short refinance is getting a lender to agree to it, as it is often considered a risky transaction. Because of this, it can take months to get a short refinance, and there are no guarantees the borrower will receive one.  If the borrower's bank does agree to a short refinance, his or her credit will not necessarily be negatively affected. In this sense, a short refinance is no better than a short sale. However, this is a much better end result than allowing one's property to be foreclosed upon. A short sale can affect one's credit as little as 50 points as opposed to a foreclosure, which could affect credit by 300+ points. A deed in lieu of foreclosure has a much more devastating effect on one's credit. In addition, a short sale or short refinance will be recorded with credit bureaus as paid in full or settled for less. It is very common for homeowners to be misinformed by real estate professionals not familiar with FHA guidelines that a short sale or short refinance is no different than a foreclosure; this is untrue, according to HUD. In fact, if a borrower follows FHA guidelines, they can qualify for a new FHA purchase the first day after a short sale.

This is, however, not the case with the Making Home Affordable Programs through the federal government.  When using the Home Affordable Foreclosure Alternatives (HAFA) Program, short sales and deeds in lieu may not impact one's credit report as negatively as other programs or options. From the Making Home Affordable website: "Unlike conventional short sales, a HAFA short sale completely releases you from your mortgage debt after selling the property. This means you will no longer be responsible for the amount that falls "short" of the amount you still owe. The deficiency is guaranteed to be waived by the servicer.  In a HAFA short sale, your mortgage company works with you to determine an acceptable sale price.  HAFA has a less negative effect on your credit score than foreclosure or conventional short sales." Homeowners can utilize specialized negotiators to ensure their rights are protected.

New FHA guidelines
However, new Federal Housing Administration short refinance options implemented earlier this month make it easier for a borrower to short refinance their home. These new guidelines were developed to help borrowers with negative equity. The new guidelines were developed to help borrowers who defaulted on their loans through no fault of their own. The new modifications give more flexibility to mortgage servicers (the person you contact if you have questions about your mortgage loan account) as well as to the originators to help unemployed homeowners. These changes are being funded with $50 billion allocated to housing programs by the Troubled Asset Relief Program. These programs were developed to help responsible homeowners, such as those who continually made their payments on time, to avoid foreclosure. The current mortgage servicers of borrowers' home loans are under no government requirements to entertain a short payoff refinance, which is why most borrowers find it is beneficial to hire a mortgage broker that employs specialized negotiators to take care of the short negotiating for the borrowers.  Once an agreement has been reached, a new FHA lender will be required to refinance the loan.

References

External links
 http://portal.hud.gov/portal/page/portal/HUD/press/press_releases_media_advisories/2010/HUDNo.10-05
 http://www.zillow.com/blog/mortgage/2010/03/29/fha-short-refinance-does-this-make-it-real/
 http://www.governmentrefinanceassistance.com/editorial-predictions-on-how-the-new-short-refinance-program-will-work-in-practice/
 http://www.thetruthaboutmortgage.com/what-is-a-short-refinance/

Personal finance